Andrea Britton is a British singer-songwriter and marketing consultant, and is also the Founder and Editor of Gozo in the House.

Biography
Britton has been releasing music since 2002. Britton's single "Am I on Your Mind?", recorded with Oxygen, made it to No. 30 on the UK Singles Chart in late 2002. In 2005, she had another hit single, "Winter", with DT8 Project, which made No. 35. Her other notable songs include the singles "Time Still Drifts Away" and "Inner Sense" with The Disco Brothers, "Wait for You" with Lost Witness, "Take My Hand" with Jurgen Vries (which peaked at #23) and "Counting Down The Days" with Sunfreakz in 2007 (peaked at No. 37 on the UK chart).  She has appeared on numerous compilation albums worldwide.

She fronted the Lord Large Experiment with the keyboard player and composer Stephen Large. Their debut album, The Lord's First Eleven, was released on Acid Jazz. She also shared the stage with Dave Randall on his project Slovo. They toured with Lamb, Moloko and Damien Rice. Britton supported Kylie Minogue on her Fever Tour, and continues to appear live around the world, more recently supporting Kelly Rowland. Britton also writes for other artists.

References

British women singers
Trance singers
British songwriters
Living people
Year of birth missing (living people)